Teamo Supremo is an American animated television series created by Phil Walsh. Animated in the limited animation style pioneered by Jay Ward, predecessors which inspired its style, it tells of three superhero children: Captain Crandall, Skate Lad, and Rope Girl.

The series made its broadcast debut for ABC's Disney's One Saturday Morning block on January 19, 2002, where most of its first season aired. However, it started regularly airing on Toon Disney in September of that same year, where most of its second season premiered. During the spring of 2003, about half of its second season premiered on what had been by then renamed ABC Kids. On September 13, 2003, it was taken off ABC Kids, leaving the rest of the episodes to premiere on Toon Disney, ending its run by 2004. Thirty-nine episodes were made, with 76 total stories (all but two episodes had two 11-minute long stories slotted in its 22-minute time slot).

Plot
Kid superheroes Captain Crandall, Skate Lad and Rope Girl protect the state of South Dakota from various bad guys when called in by Governor Kevin. They take on bad guys like Baron Blitz, Madame Snake, Laser Pirate, Helius Inflato, Dehydro, Mr. Large, and other bad guys while also occasionally interacting with the other local superheroes.

Characters

Teamo Supremo
 Captain Crandall / Cap (voiced by Spencer Breslin) – The leader of Teamo Supremo, who believes that he is an alien superhero from another planet. He is often addressed as "Cap" by his teammates, and his battle catchphrase is "Buh-Za!". In later episodes, Crandall's seemingly imaginary superpowers and backstory seem to actually become canon. In the finale, he experiences a sudden burst of superhuman strength and defense. Also, his skin turns purple when he gets very angry. His gadgets include a special Level 7 belt, as well as a yo-yo, marbles, a boomerang, and a shield.
 Hector Felipé Corrio / Skate Lad (voiced by Alanna Ubach) – The Hispanic member of Teamo Supremo, Hector is the state's skateboarding champion. His main gadget is a patriotic-themed jet-propelled skateboard and his catchphrase is "Chi-Ka!".
 Brenda / Rope Girl (voiced by Alanna Ubach) – The sole female member of Teamo Supremo, she has purple hair and a buck tooth and speaks with a western drawl. Her catchphrase is "Wuh-Pa!", and her gadget is a jumprope, which she uses as a lasso when battling villains, but can also be used to transform herself, Crandall, and Hector into their heroic alter egos when all three jump rope together.

Allies
 Governor G. Kevin (voiced by Martin Mull) – The groovy governor of South Dakota. He always calls for Teamo when necessary and he sometimes has to lend excuse notes if the crime makes Teamo late for class (or if it means they miss class for the rest of the day).
 Chief Epsilon (voiced by Brian Doyle-Murray) – The chief of police who does not take kindly to Teamo taking police matters into their own hands. He once tried to operate as a costumed superhero himself, using the code-name 'Lawman', but made a hash of it since his 'gadgets' consisted of an umbrella and an eggwhisk. The Chief also suffers from Beat Deafness.
 Mrs. Crandall (voiced by Julia Sweeney) – Crandall's human mother. He refers to her as "Earth Mom" since he thinks he is an alien. She is completely oblivious to the fact that Crandall and his friends are superheroes (or so it may seem).
 Jean Crandall (voiced by Rachel Crane) – Crandall's older human sister who is aware of his superhero career. She often gives the team advice, claiming it's necessary if she "wants to be a [career] some day".
 Mr. Paulson (voiced by Fred Willard) – The eccentric director of Level 7, a top-secret facility that makes Teamo's gadgets.
 Samantha (voiced by Kim Gillingham) – Paulson's lab assistant.
 Mrs. Woolingantz (voiced by Sydney Walsh) – Teamo's teacher who often excuses them if Governor Kevin needs them. She doesn't assign much homework, but gets angry when it isn't done.
 Action (vocal effects provided by Frank Welker) – Crandall's dog. He is sometimes called to help Teamo in certain missions like Krypto and Ace the Bat-Hound.
 Mrs. Corrio – Hector's mother.
 The Twins – Hector's unnamed twin sisters, who often speak gibberish in unison.
 Brenda's Mom – Brenda's mother, from whom she seems to get her Southern accent.
 Barclae / Diaper Dude – Brenda's baby brother, who once helped Teamo in one of their adventures. His first spoken word was "Brenda."
 Teamo's Dads – The kids' respective fathers, but not much is known about them as they've only been seen in one episode. Crandall's dad seems to read the newspaper a lot and Hector's dad runs a skateboard shop.
 Patience (voiced by Vene L. Arcoraci) – The Chief's daughter. She has her mother's figure and her father's vocal cords.
 Mauricio the Comedian (voiced by Phil Morris) – A black comedian. He has at least twice been the target of villains seeking revenge on him.
 Tiffany Javelins / Songstress / Sally Smith (voiced by Shelley Bennett) – A teen singer whom Brenda idolizes. Originally worked for the Mischievous Manager, but turned good afterwards. Strangely, Toon Disney's official site for the show still labelled her as a villain.
 B. Barry Berylium (voiced by Jack Larson) – The editor-in-chief of the state's newspaper, The Stately Planet. He prefers being addressed as "Chief" over "Sir".
 Ollie Jimson (voiced by Jason Marsden) – A rookie news journalist who works for Mr. Berylium, who finds it annoying that Ollie never calls him "Chief". His name is a nod to Jimmy Olsen.
 Viva Voom – Governor Kevin's Dutch girlfriend from high school. She is now a famous actress, but still has her relationship with Kevin.
 A fellow member of the school faculty is usually the one to tell Mrs. Woolingantz that Governor Kevin needs Teamo's help. Her name was never revealed in the series, nor did she ever actually have dialogue (she always whispers to the teacher).
 Newscaster (voiced by Jeff Bennett) - The state's unnamed newsman who always pops up on TV to deliver news. His name was never revealed either.

Superheroes
There are other superheroes that help keep the state safe from crime:

 Mr. Gruff (voiced by Clancy Brown impersonating Mr. T) - An action hero who Teamo Supremo idolizes.
 The Silver Shield / Gordon (voiced by Robert Stack) – Crandall's grandfather who has had a Captain America-like superhero identity and fought crime during World War II. His battle cry is "Let freedom ring."
 The Dark Talon / Nick (voiced by Gary Owens) – Crandall's other grandfather who has had a Batman-like superhero identity and fought crime during World War II.
 Captain Excellent (voiced by John O'Hurley) – An old superhero whom Crandall idolizes.

Villains

Recurring Villains
 Baron Blitz (voiced by Maurice LaMarche in a German accent) – A short blue-skinned man, possibly from an alien world himself. He is known for taking control of wax statues and later on bronze statues and animatronics. Baron Blitz is from Blitzlevania.
 Technor the Mechanized Man (voiced by Jeff Bennett) – Originally invented by Paulson to be a robot psychologist, he became power-hungry. Technor often travels in his power-sucking Magna Body. A spoof of Marvel Comics villain MODOK.
 Techno-Creeps - The henchmen of Technor. Their outfits are similar to the A.I.M. Agents.
 Chopper Daddy (voiced by Jess Harnell) – A motorcycle-themed villain.
 Scooter Lad a.k.a. Snake a.k.a. Justin (voiced by Pamela Adlon) – Chopper Daddy's son who rides a scooter. He has twice tricked Teamo into believing they could trust him and his battle catchphrase is "Hoo-Ka!"
 Madame Snake (voiced by Sydney Walsh) – A femme fatale with snake-like features the ability to change her appearance, as well as an outrageously bad fashion sense.
 Toy Boys - Madame Snake's henchmen.
 The Birthday Bandit (voiced by Mark Hamill) – B.B. the Clown is a birthday clown gone bad who often robs birthday parties and other special occasions. He briefly changed his name to the Valentine Bandit when he kidnapped Viva Voom.
 Party Favors - Similarly-dressed henchmen of Birthday Bandit. One Party Favor is named Evelyn.
 Laser Pirate (voiced by Tim Curry in most appearances, Jeff Bennett in "In the Beginning...") – Larry is a former colleague of Paulson. He is the only pirate that doesn't like water due to a college incident that ruined his invention. His hideout is a skyscraper that flies around (a possible homage to Monty Python's The Meaning of Life).
 Mauve-Beard - One of Laser Pirate's henchmen.
 Chartruese-Beard - One of Laser Pirate's henchmen.
 Indigo-Beard - One of Laser Pirate's henchmen.
 Helius Inflato (voiced by Joel Murray) – A guy who can inflate himself and fly, hence his name. He wants to build a casino in the state, but isn't allowed to.
 Dehydro (voiced by Diedrich Bader in a British accent) – A former cruise director/diving instructor who gave up his gig and became a water-themed villain. Dehydro claims that humanity's true destiny lies beneath the waves. He has a habit of repeating himself and repeating himself is what he does. Dehydro over-reiterates and says things too many times.
 Amphibious Army - The minions of Dehydro.
 Mr. Large (voiced by Edward Asner) – A crime boss who likes large items.
 Ernie the Hat (voiced by Maurice LaMarche) - One of Mr. Large's henchmen who wears a fedora.
 Mickey the Shirt (voiced by Jeff Bennett) - One of Mr. Large's henchmen who wears a tropical shirt.
 Rosie the Purse (voiced by Sydney Walsh) - One of Mr. Large's henchmen who is always carrying a purse.
 Mr. Vague (voiced by Gary Cole) – A rather dull bad guy with grey skin. He is never specific with what he wants to steal.
 The Gauntlet (voiced by Wallace Shawn) – Crawford is formerly one of Paulson's co-workers obsessed with power. He continually wreaks havoc with a pair of powerful Gauntlets he's always able to steal.
 Hypnotheria (voiced by April Winchell) – A hypnosis-themed villain who thinks of herself as royalty and speaks of herself in the 2nd person.
 Electronica (voiced by Kerri Kenney) – Polly Pixel is former video game designer who was furious over the fact that players constantly beat her games using cheat codes.
 Dr. 'Droid (voiced by S. Scott Bullock) – An evil scientist who plans to replace all of the State's citizens with robot look-alikes (which also attempted to replace 'Droid himself with a robot version of him).
 Le Poodle (voiced by Jeff Bennett) – A notorious cat burglar from France.
 The Mischievous Manager – She appeared as the manager of The Songstress where she used her to control all the girls in the state with Songstress' songs. Teamo Supremo managed to defeat the Mischievous Manager who is then arrested by the Chief. She later collaborated with Dr. Droid in a plot that involves a robot version of Songstress.
 Big Skull (voiced by John Kassir) – An alien supervillain/real estate baron who was the mastermind behind the Cloaked Skull. His real name is pronounced by clicking your teeth together three times. He once captured most of the adult superheroes except for Captain Excellent who was attending a celebrity golf tournament at the time.
 Cloaked Skull (voiced by Joe Flaherty) – A masked villain who haunted different locations and was actually just random people controlled by Big Skull using alien technology in the masks.

One-Shot Villains
 The Sinister Stylist (voiced by Sydney Walsh) – Coco Caliente is an ex-soap opera actress who had a bad hair day and ended up humiliated by TV funnyman Maurico, due to the almost constant laughter of the audience attending that year's state awards show. She has since then sworn to give bad hair to everyone and display it to the world.
 Fabrica (voiced by Nicole Sullivan) – A stuffed toy maker who used them to commit crimes. She once brought to life all the stuffed toys in the state including Teamo Supremo's stuffed toys.
 Dr. Pogo (voiced by John Kassir) – A mad scientist-like villain who travels everywhere on a pogo-stick (as do his three henchmen).
 Cheapskate (voiced by John Kassir) – A skateboarding villain who tried to frame Skate Lad for all his crimes.
 The Put Down Artist (voiced by Barry Diamond) – A stand up comedian who use his comedic talents to insult people and commit crimes. He appears to be a parody of the Batman villain Joker.
 Hecklers (voiced by Rob Paulsen) - Three unnamed hecklers who serve as the henchmen of the Put Down Artist.
 The Tourorist (voiced by Tress MacNeille) – Frenchy Stakes is a tour guide who became disgruntled when her tour party didn't respect the monuments so she decided to steal them all.
 Dousens - The Tourorist's henchmen.
 Mirrorstar (voiced by Rob Paulsen) - A vain supervillain.
 Vanity, Hubris, and Narcissism - Mirrorstar's henchmen.
 The Phony Dentist (voiced by Tim Curry) – An evil dentist who used a mind control ray on his patients to try and take over the state.
 Helga - The Phony Dentist's assistant.
 Car-Go - A criminal racer.
 Pit Crew - Piston, Camshaft and the other guy are Car-Go's henchmen.
 Lord Druid (voiced by Mark Hamill in a British accent) – A descendant of the family that once ruled the state. He tried to change history so his family was still in control.
 Angler (voiced by Stephen Root) - A fisherman-themed villain. Billy Jim Dixon is a former host of the TV show "Fishin' with Billy Jim Dixon" until the show was cancelled and his fishing license revoked due to his henchmen being secretly behind his expert fishing skills that also involved hooking store-bought fish to his line. This led to him planning revenge on the state by using special lures called Smart Baits to hypnotize the state's fish to his fishing nets while plotting to corner the fish stick market.
 Fishmongers (voiced by Stephen Root and Eythann Scadron) - The henchmen of the Angler. Two of them are named Jeb and Zeke while the third one was unnamed and had no dialogue.
 Vladimir Trettiak (voiced by Joe Flaherty) – An old enemy from the Chief's younger days. He uses technology from Level 8 which happens to be a step up from Level 7.
 Sinister Shillelagh - A villain with good luck.
 Sloppy Joe (voiced by Stuart Pankin) - A messy supervillain.
 Zomnambulist (voiced by Jonathan Freeman) - A dream-manipulating supervillain. He was once the States' leading dream researcher until he was denied a grant for some new dream research. This caused him to plan revenge on the State by tampering with the dreams of the children by using an Alpha Wave Dream Projector.
 Sleepwalkers (voiced by Jeff Bennett) - The henchmen of Zomnambulist.
 Will 2 Wynn (voiced by David Leisure) – Governor Kevin's opponent in his re-election. His real name is William Aloysius Wynn, but when Governor Kevin beat him in the election for high school class president (which according to Kevin, was the only time Wynn lost at anything), Wynn changed his name to Will 2 Wynn. Will seemed certain to win the election due to his massive campaign fund, which came from a group known as "Will's Friends". After doing some investigating in the archives following a talk with B. Barry Berylium, Teamo discovered that the "Will's Friends" group consisted of Baron Blitz, Madame Snake, Laser Pirate, Dehydro, Birthday Bandit, Electronica, Mr. Large, and Helius Inflato, which caused Will to reveal his true motive. Will planned to get back at Governor Kevin for beating him by helping every villain in the state get back at Teamo. However, Will was beaten and his criminal dealings were exposed, causing him to lose the election as it is illegal to accept campaign donations from criminals, and state law prohibits the election of anyone in jail.
 Pollsters - Will 2 Wynn's henchmen.
 Mr. Alchemy (voiced by Xander Berkeley) - An alchemy-themed supervillain who wields an alchemy wand. He once stole Mr. Gruff's voice in order to ruin everyone's holiday season since he thought that Christmas was for people getting new things and not giving to other people. Teamo Supremo and Mr. Gruff set him straight and he undid the damages, restored Mr. Gruff's voice, and turned the ornaments on the Christmas tree to gold.
 Acolytes - The henchmen of Mr. Alchemy.
 The Sons of the Flange Brothers (voiced by Jeff Bennett and Phil Morris) – The self-explanatory sons of the acrobatic villains the Flange Brothers with some of them being cousins to each other. They can come together to form a whirlwind attack.
 DJ Despicable (voiced by Casey Kasem) – A supervillain who used to be a popular radio DJ who created a song for Teamo called "Doin' the Supremo", however, he unwittingly signed a record contract that didn't allow him to collect royalties for his song being used on the radio. Enraged by this, he changed his name to DJ Despicable and he and his henchmen, The Mikes, used a special music to hypnotize people into doing an unstoppable dance while he's on his crime spree. He was defeated by the Chief as the latter's Beat Deafness rendered him immune to DJ's hypnotic music.
 Barney the Bungler (voiced by Billy West) - A clumsy low-level villain.
 Comrade Z (voiced by Maurice LaMarche) - A villain who is an old enemy of the Silver Shield.
 General Incompetence and Major Delays - Two inept ex-militarists.
 Libro Shushman - A librarian who turned to a life of crime.
 Dr. Minutia -
 Lo Fi (voiced by Michael McKean) – A famous musician who turned to a life of crime after the public rejected his experimental use of low frequency music, which he now uses in his crimes. His real name is Daniel Patrick.
 Lavalizer – A minor villain with control of fire.
 Mean Thumb – A villain with very large thumbs.

Episodes
Most of the episodes in the final two seasons did not air in production code order.

Season 1 (2002)
The first season consisted of 13 episodes and aired on ABC.

Season 2 (2002–03)
The second season consisted of nineteen episodes, which makes the longest season to air. Seven episodes were aired on ABC. Twelve episodes were aired on Toon Disney.

  Aired on ABC.
  Aired on Toon Disney.

Season 3 (2003–04)
The third and final season consisted of seven episodes, which makes the shortest season to air, and aired on Toon Disney.

Notes

References

External links
 
 

2000s American animated television series
2000s American comic science fiction television series
2000s American superhero comedy television series
2002 American television series debuts
2004 American television series endings
ABC Kids (TV programming block)
American children's animated action television series
American children's animated adventure television series
American children's animated comic science fiction television series
American children's animated superhero television series
Child superheroes
English-language television shows
Superhero teams
Television series by Disney Television Animation
Toon Disney original programming
Animated television series about children